John Ewing (6 October 1863 – 30 November 1933) was an Australian politician who served in both houses of the Parliament of Western Australia. He was a member of the Legislative Assembly from 1901 to 1904 and again from 1905 to 1908, and then served as a member of the Legislative Council from 1916 until his death.

Ewing was born in Wollongong, New South Wales, to Elizabeth (née Thomson) and Thomas Campbell Ewing. His brothers, Norman Ewing and Sir Thomas Ewing, were also politicians. Ewing was educated at The King's School, Parramatta, and afterward worked as a surveyor in southern New South Wales. He came to Western Australia in 1896, initially working as a surveyor on the goldfields. He later settled in the South West, living at Bunbury, and in 1897 was responsible for surveying the townsite of Collie. At the 1901 state election, Ewing was elected to represent the South-West Mining constituency in the Legislative Assembly, running as a supporter of the Ministerialist faction (led by George Leake). He lost his seat (which had been renamed Collie) at the 1904 election, to Labor's Ernest Henshaw.

After losing his seat, Ewing was elected chairman of the Collie Road Board in 1905. However, he served for only a short amount of time, as he re-claimed his former seat at that year's state election. At the 1908 election, Ewing lost his seat for a second time, defeated by Labor's Arthur Wilson (who would hold Collie until 1947). Afterward, he returned to his previous profession as a surveyor, working for the Midland Railway Company. Ewing contested the seat of Bunbury at the 1911 state election, but was unsuccessful, losing to Labor's William Thomas. He eventually re-entered parliament in 1916, winning a Legislative Council by-election for South-West Province (caused by the death of John Winthrop Hackett). Ewing was appointed chairman of the committees in the Legislative Council in August 1920, and in June 1923 was elevated to Sir James Mitchell's ministry, as Minister for Education, Minister for Justice, and Minister for the North-West.

The Nationalist–Country coalition government was defeated at the 1924 state election, with Ewing consequently losing his place in the ministry. He did not return to the ministry when the coalition was returned to power at the 1927 election. In the last years of his life, Ewing was in frequent poor health, and went blind, although he remained a member of parliament. He died in a convalescent home in Perth in November 1933, aged 70.

References

|-

|-

1863 births
1933 deaths
Australian surveyors
Members of the Western Australian Legislative Assembly
Members of the Western Australian Legislative Council
People educated at The King's School, Parramatta
People from Wollongong
Western Australian local councillors
Nationalist Party of Australia members of the Parliament of Western Australia